Jamma nich is a studio album by German pop singer Nena. The title is a colloquial rendering of the German injunction jammere nicht! ("don't complain" or "don't whine"). Nena wrote the album with Annette Humpe (Ideal, Ich und Ich), who also co-produced, and Luci van Org (Lucilectric). Their involvement may explain the "synth pop tendency" that makes it "a unique kind of semideparture in her catalog". By the time Jamma nich was released, Nena was pregnant with her fifth and final child but continued a full round of TV and promotional appearances in support of the various singles released from the album until late into her pregnancy. The first official single was "Ganz gelassen", which at one point was called "Riesenarschloch", a swear word included in the lyrics. The second single released was "Alles was du willst"; there were also promotional singles "Jamma nich" and "Auf dich und mich".

Track listing

Charts

References

External links
 Nena.de the official Nena website
 

1997 albums
Nena albums
German-language albums
Polydor Records albums